Roger Philip Goad,  (5 August 1935 – 29 August 1975) was an explosives officer with London's Metropolitan Police Service who was posthumously awarded the George Cross for the heroism he displayed on 29 August 1975. He had previously been awarded the British Empire Medal in 1958 for gallantry whilst serving with the Royal Army Ordnance Corps in Cyprus, for repeated acts of deliberate courage in the disarming of bombs and booby traps set by terrorists.

Early life
Goad was born in Jutogh, India. He was the son of Ronald William Goad and Daisy Bertha Goad (née Martin). Ronald Goad was a Staff sergeant in the Royal Artillery.

Army career
Goad enlisted in the Royal Army Ordnance Corps and worked his way up the ranks. He was a sergeant at the time he received the British Empire Medal in February 1958; and a warrant officer class 2 when he received a commission as lieutenant in February 1968. He was promoted to captain two years later, and retired from the army in August 1974. He then became an explosives officer with the Metropolitan Police.

George Cross
On the night of 29 August 1975, Joseph O'Connell and Eddie Butler, members of the IRA's Balcombe Street Gang placed a bomb in the doorway of a shoe shop in Kensington Church Street in London. The Balcombe Street Gang was responsible for the 1974–1975 terror campaign in London which included the Guildford pub bombings, the London Hilton bombing & the Woolwich pub bombing among many others.

Following a telephone tip-off, police officers discovered the device. Goad was the senior bomb disposal expert on the scene. Goad attempted to defuse the bomb but it exploded, killing him instantly. It is unknown whether the bomb was detonated by its timer, or whether Goad triggered the bomb's anti-handling device

He was a 40-year-old married man with two children. His citation was published in the London Gazette of 1 October 1976.

The four members of the IRA unit were captured four months later at the conclusion of the Balcombe Street siege. After being convicted of a number of murders, the four were imprisoned for life, receiving a whole life tariff. They were released in 1999 as part of the Good Friday Agreement.

See also
 Kenneth Howorth (Killed trying to defuse an IRA bomb in Oxford Street in October 1981)
 List of British police officers killed in the line of duty

References

1935 births
1975 deaths
Bomb disposal personnel
British military personnel of the Cyprus Emergency
British military personnel of The Troubles (Northern Ireland)
Metropolitan Police officers killed in the line of duty
British recipients of the George Cross
British terrorism victims
Deaths by improvised explosive device in England
Male murder victims
Metropolitan Police officers
People killed by the Provisional Irish Republican Army
Recipients of the British Empire Medal
Royal Army Ordnance Corps officers
Terrorism deaths in England
People from Shimla district
People murdered in London
Royal Army Ordnance Corps soldiers